Rowing Blazers is American clothing and accessories brand founded by Jack Carlson. The brand is known for its blazers, rugby shirts, and other apparel, as well as its "preppy" style and its collaborations and limited-edition capsules.

Overview 
Rowing Blazers was established in New York City in 2017, producing collections in Manhattan's Garment District and in Europe.

The brand takes its name from Carlson's book about the myths and rituals related to the blazer at rowing clubs around the world. In creating the brand, Carlson drew on his varied interests in streetwear and more traditional menswear, as well as his experiences at Oxford, in the sport of rowing, and as a field archaeologist in Italy. Aside from its ready-to-wear collections, the brand is known for creating blazers for many of the world's leading rowing clubs and collegiate rowing teams, as well as other clubs and organizations, including The Explorers Club.

Rowing Blazers is known for its cult following, the diversity of its customers, and for its celebrity clientele, including Timothée Chalamet, Dwyane Wade, and Emily Ratajkowski.

The brand has launched pop-up shops and events in several cities, and has been carried by retailers including Beams and United Arrows.

Rowing Blazers has been featured in The New York Times, The London Times, and other publications. GQ referred to Rowing Blazers as "the brand that's saving prep by kicking down its walls," and The London Times as a "cult streetwear brand, worn by Timothée Chalamet, inspired by a young, sporting Prince Charles." Men's Journal described it as "classic British and Ivy League iconography with a post-modern, punk twist."

Collaborations 
The brand has released capsule collections in partnership with the National Basketball Association (NBA), Harry's New York Bar in Paris, the estate of photographer Slim Aarons, and numerous rowing and rugby organizations, including the U.S. national rowing and rugby teams. The brand has also collaborated with a wide range of other apparel and accessory brands. In July 2021, the brand released three limited-edition watches in collaboration with Japanese watch manufacturer Seiko.

In 2020, the brand launched its first women's collection by partnering with Joanna Osborne and Sally Muir, founders of Warm & Wonderful and designers of the "black sheep" sweater worn by Princess Diana. Together they released the original sheep sweater for the first time in thirty years.

References 

2017 establishments in New York City
Clothing brands of the United States
Companies based in New York City